KF Minatori is a professional football club from Kosovo which competes in the Second League. The club is based in Mitrovicë. Their home ground is the Minatori Stadium which has a seating capacity of 500.

See also
 List of football clubs in Kosovo

References

Football clubs in Kosovo
Association football clubs established in 1946
Sport in Mitrovica, Kosovo